Musica con creta is an album by Italian pianist and composer Fabio Mengozzi, released in 2023.

Track listing
 Lullaby – 1:24 
 Eden – 1:39
 Antemoessa – 2:20
 Estasi – 1:20
 Thrênos – 1:28
 Ultimi voli – 1:02
 Catacumbae – 1:01
 Clepsidra – 1:12
 Galaxies – 2:04
 My memories – 1:07
 Furiae – 1:18
 The magical garden of Faduah – 1:27
 Hanami – 2:13
 Windows – 1:17
 Maràna Tha – 2:01

References

External links 
 
Musica con creta on Spotify

Contemporary classical music albums
2023 albums